Imre Hideghéthy (1 September 1860 – 19 October 1920) was a Hungarian politician who served as Minister without portfolio of Croatian Affairs between 1916 and 1917.

References
 Magyar Életrajzi Lexikon

1860 births
1920 deaths
People from Bogdanovci
Ministers of Croatian Affairs of Hungary